Uspenka is a rural locality (a village) in Chusovoy, Perm Krai, Russia. The population was 236 as of 2010. There are 9 streets.

Geography 
Uspenka is located 52 km west of Chusovoy. Vilizhnaya is the nearest rural locality.

References 

Rural localities in Perm Krai